The article contains the timeline of the prelude to the 2022 Russian invasion of Ukraine.

2021
 10 November 2021, the United States reports an unusual movement of Russian troops near the borders of Ukraine. By 28 November 2021, Ukraine has a reported build-up of 92,000 Russian troops.
 7 December 2021, US President Joe Biden warns President of Russia Vladimir Putin of "strong economic and other measures" if Russia attacks Ukraine.
 17 December 2021, Putin proposes a prohibition on Ukraine joining NATO, which Ukraine rejects.

2022
 17 January 2022, Russian troops begin arriving in Russia's ally Belarus, ostensibly "for military exercises".
 19 January 2022, the US gives Ukraine $200 million in security aid.
 19 January 2022, Biden states in a press conference: "Russia will be held accountable if it invades. And it depends on what it does."
 24 January 2022, NATO puts troops on standby.
 25 January 2022, Russian exercises involving 6,000 troops and 60 jets take place in Russia near Ukraine and Crimea.

February 2022 

 10 February 2022, Russia and Belarus begins 10 days of military maneuvers.
 17 February 2022, fighting escalates in separatist regions of eastern Ukraine.

 21 February 2022, Vladimir Putin ordered Russian forces to enter the seperatist republics in eastern Ukraine. He also announced Russian recognition of the two pro-Russian breakaway regions in eastern Ukraine (the Donetsk People's Republic and the Luhansk People's Republic). This announcement led to the first round of economic sanctions from NATO countries the following day. 

In Putin's televised "address concerning the events in Ukraine" before the announcement, he stated his belief that Vladimir Lenin was the "author and architect" of Ukraine and labelled Ukrainians who had taken down Lenin's monuments "ungrateful descendants", saying "This is what they call decommunization. Do you want decommunization? Well, that suits us just fine. But it is unnecessary, as they say, to stop halfway. We are ready to show you what real decommunization means for Ukraine."

See also 
Timeline of the war in Donbas (2022)

References

Timelines of the Russo-Ukrainian War
Prelude to the 2022 Russian invasion of Ukraine
Political timelines of the 2020s by year
2020s timelines